Lieutenant General Kuno Augustus Friedrich Karl Detlev Graf von Moltke (13 December 1847 – 19 March 1923), adjutant to Kaiser Wilhelm II and military commander of Berlin, was a principal in the homosexual scandal known as the Harden-Eulenburg Affair (1907) that rocked the Kaiser's entourage.  Moltke was forced to leave the military service.

Biography 
In 1896 Moltke, a 'confirmed bachelor' in his early 50s, married Nathalie von Hayden ('Lilly'), a woman more than twenty years his junior. The couple soon became estranged, with Moltke's physician later alleging that Lilly had physically attacked Moltke several times. The couple were eventually divorced in 1902 (the formal divorce proceedings took several years to conclude).

The Eulenburg affair 

In 1907 the journalist Maximilian Harden publicly accused Moltke and Philipp, Prince of Eulenburg of a homosexual relationship. At this time, homosexual acts between men were illegal per Paragraph 175 of the German Criminal Code.

Accusations and counter-accusations quickly multiplied. Later that year, Moltke sued Harden for libel. His ex-wife Lilly (who had since remarried and was now called Lilly von Elbe) voluntarily testified against him. Magnus Hirschfeld, a physician and sexologist who supported the legalization of homosexuality in Germany, also testified that he believed Moltke to be homosexual. The court sensationally acquitted Harden and concluded that he had been telling the truth about Moltke's sexuality. However, the verdict was voided due to faulty procedure.

In 1908 Harden was retried, and this time he was found guilty of libel against Moltke.

German press reaction 
After the first trial, the German press were sympathetic to Moltke.  Newspapers condemned the tactics of the defense and expressing condolence with Count von Moltke, who was declared to have presented a dignified figure in court. Taggeblat condemned Harden for his salacious articles, and argued that they amounted to the unnecessary hunting down of an old soldier.

Later life 
Moltke played little further part in public life after the Harden-Eulenberg affair. He died in Breslau in 1923.

Orders and decorations 
German honours
 Service Award Cross (Prussia)
  Iron Cross, 2nd Class (Prussia)
  Knight of the Order of the Red Eagle, 3rd Class with Bow and Crown; 2nd Class with Oak Leaves (Prussia)
  Knight of the Royal Order of the Crown, 2nd Class with Star (Prussia)
  Knight's Cross of the Royal House Order of Hohenzollern (Prussia)
  Commander of the Order of the Zähringer Lion, 2nd Class, 1894; Commander 1st Class, 1904 (Baden)
  Knight of the Military Merit Order, 2nd Class with Swords; Commander (Bavaria)
  Grand Commander of the House Order of the Wendish Crown (Mecklenburg)
  Grand Cross of the Order of the Griffon (Mecklenburg)
  Commander of the Order of the White Falcon (Saxe-Weimar-Eisenach)
  Commander of the Albert Order, 1st Class (Saxony)
  Cross of Honour of the House Order of Schaumburg-Lippe, 2nd Class (Schaumburg-Lippe)
  Cross of Honour of the Order of the Württemberg Crown, with Crown, 1893 (Württemberg)

Foreign honours
  Knight of the Imperial Order of the Iron Crown, 2nd Class (Austria-Hungary)
  Commander of the Imperial Austrian Order of Franz Joseph, with Star (Austria-Hungary)
  Commander of the Order of Saints Maurice and Lazarus (Italy)
  Commander of the Order of Orange-Nassau (Netherlands)
  Order of the Medjidie, 1st Class (Ottoman Empire)
  Knight of the Imperial Order of Saint Anna, 2nd Class in Diamonds (Russia)
  Knight of the Imperial Order of Saint Stanislaus, 1st Class (Russia)
  Commander of the Most Noble Order of the Crown of Siam (Siam)
  Commander of the Royal Order of the Sword (Sweden)

Further reading 
 Isabel Hull, The entourage of Kaiser Wilhelm II, Cambridge 1982.
 John Röhl, Des Kaisers bester Freund, in: Kaiser, Hof und Staat. Wilhelm II. und die deutsche Politik, Munich 1988, pp. 35–77, v.a. 64 ff.
 Nicolaus Sombart, Wilhelm II. Sündenbock und Herr der Mitte, Berlin 1996.
 Olaf Jessen: Die Moltkes. Biographie einer Familie, C. H. Beck, Munich 2010,

References

External links 
 

1847 births
1923 deaths
19th-century German LGBT people
Counts of Germany
LGBT military personnel
German LGBT people
Lieutenant generals of Prussia
People from Mecklenburg-Strelitz
People from Neustrelitz
20th-century German LGBT people
Recipients of the Iron Cross (1870), 2nd class
Commanders of the Order of Franz Joseph
Commanders of the Order of Orange-Nassau
Commanders of the Order of Saints Maurice and Lazarus
Recipients of the Order of the Medjidie, 1st class
Recipients of the Order of St. Anna, 2nd class
Recipients of the Order of Saint Stanislaus (Russian), 1st class
Commanders of the Order of the Sword